The Kingdom are an American professional wrestling tag team, who work for All Elite Wrestling (AEW) and Ring of Honor (ROH), and previously also appeared with New Japan Pro-Wrestling (NJPW), consisting of Adam Cole, Matt Hardy, Matt Taven, Mike Bennett, T. K. O'Ryan and Vinny Marseglia. Under multiple incarnations The Kingdom formerly held the ROH World Tag Team Championship, the IWGP Tag Team Championship (Taven and Bennett) and the ROH World Six-Man Tag Team Championship a record three times (Taven, O'Ryan And Marseglia).

In 2020, Taven and Bennett reunited as The OGK. In 2022, Taven, Bennet, & Maria debut in AEW under The Kingdom name once again.

History

Ring of Honor (2014–2019)

Adam Cole’s Kingdom (2014–2016) 
At Final Battle 2013, prior to the official formation, Matt Hardy helped Adam Cole retain the ROH World Championship, forming a tag team in the process. Shortly thereafter Michael Bennett and Maria Kanellis joined both Hardy and Cole involving himself in their feud with The Briscoes. At Supercard of Honor VIII both Hardy and Bennett helped Cole defeat Jay Briscoe to become the undisputed ROH World Champion, with Hardy taking possession of Briscoe’s unsanctioned “Real World Title” belt and renaming it the “ROH Iconic Championship”. On June 22, 2014, at Best in the World 2014, Matt Hardy and Michael Bennett accompanied by Maria Kanellis and Nick Searcy were defeated in a no disqualification match against The Briscoes (Jay and Mark Briscoe). On July 12, 2014, The Kingdom officially made their debut as a stable in Ring of Honor when Hardy, Bennett, and Adam Cole faced War Machine (Hanson and Raymond Rowe) along with Michael Elgin in a six-man tag team match which ended in a no contest. On November 15, 2014, at Glory By Honor XIII, Matt Taven, who had joined the stable back in September, teamed with Bennett as they unsuccessfully challenged reDRagon (Bobby Fish and Kyle O'Reilly) for the ROH World Tag Team Championship. At Best in the World 2014 Cole lost the ROH World Championship to Michael Elgin. In July, Hardy opted out of his ROH contract and went back to TNA. After failing to regain the ROH World Championship from now champion Jay Briscoe at Final Battle 2014, Cole announced he had suffered a shoulder injury which would require surgery.

On March 1, 2015, at the 13th Anniversary Show, Bennett and Taven defeated The Addiction (Christopher Daniels and Frankie Kazarian) as well as Karl Anderson (who competed on his own due to Doc Gallows suffering travel issues) in a three-way tag team match. On March 27, 2015, at Supercard of Honor IX, Bennett and Taven unsuccessfully challenged reDRagon (Bobby Fish and Kyle O'Reilly) for the ROH World Tag Team Championship. Cole returned from his injury at War of the Worlds ‘15, where he lost to A.J. Styles. Cole then began having tension with Bennett and Taven and even teased a reunion with former Future Shock partner Kyle O’Reilly. On September 18 at All Star Extravaganza VII, Bennett and Taven won their first-ever ROH World Tag Team Championship, when they defeated the then champions The Addiction (Frankie Kazarian and Christopher Daniels) and The Young Bucks (Matt Jackson and Nick Jackson). Later that night Cole betrayed O’Reilly during his world championship match against Jay Lethal remaining with The Kingdom and turning heel once again.  Bennett and Taven lost the title to War Machine on December 18 at Final Battle. Bennett and Kanellis left ROH after the following day's Ring of Honor Wrestling taping, after failing to come to terms on a new contract with the promotion. With Taven suffering a legitimate knee injury and subsequently turning on Cole (who would later join the Bullet Club as its U.S. side's de facto leader), The Kingdom went on hiatus.

Matt Taven’s Kingdom (2016–2019) 
On the September 18th, 2016 episode of Ring of Honor Wrestling, Taven returned and announced that The Kingdom will be competing in the tournament for the new ROH 6-Man Tag Team Championship, but wouldn't announce his partners. On a match taped on October 1, 2016 for the October 23rd, 2016 episode of Ring of Honor Wrestling, Matt Taven revealed T. K. O'Ryan and Vinny Marseglia as new members of The Kingdom and defeated Bullet Club (Adam Cole, Matt Jackson and Nick Jackson) to advance to the semi-finals of the ROH World Six-Man Tag Team Championship Tournament. On the November 19 episode of ROH TV The Kingdom defeated Team CMLL (Hechicero, Okumura and Ultimo Guerrero) to advance to the finals at the Final Battle 2016 PPV. On December 2, The Kingdom defeated Jay White, Kushida and Lio Rush in the finals to become the inaugural ROH World Six-Man Tag Team Champions. On March 11, 2017, at Ring of Honor TV taping, Taven, Marseglia and Silas Young, who filled in for an injured T. K. O'Ryan, lost the ROH World Six-Man Tag Team Championship to Bully Ray and The Briscoes. On September 27, 2019 at ROH's Death Before Dishonor XVII pay-per-view, after Rush defeated Taven for the ROH World Championship, O'Ryan and Marseglia were shown having been attacked backstage (to explain why neither of them had interfered on Taven's behalf to prevent the defeat, which they regularly had done in the past). On ROH's TV show, Marseglia attacked Taven in the ring, signalling the start of a storyline feud between the two former allies. On December 13, 2019 at ROH's Final Battle PPV, Marseglia scored an upset victory over Taven. After the match, Marseglia and Bateman attacked Taven, attempting to break Taven's ankles. On the December 14, 2019 episode of Ring of Honor Wrestling, O'Ryan announced that The Kingdom had disbanded.

New Japan Pro-Wrestling (2014–2015) 
On August 10, 2014, during the G1 Climax The Kingdom, represented by Cole and Bennett and accompanied by Maria Kanellis, made their New Japan Pro-Wrestling debuts, defeating Captain New Japan and Jushin Thunder Liger. The Kingdom, now represented by Bennett and Taven, returned to New Japan in November 2014, to take part in the 2014 World Tag League. They finished third in their block with a record of four wins and three losses. Bennett and Taven returned to NJPW on April 5, 2015, at Invasion Attack 2015, where they defeated Bullet Club (Doc Gallows and Karl Anderson) to win the IWGP Tag Team Championship. On July 5 at Dominion 7.5 in Osaka-jo Hall, The Kingdom lost the IWGP Tag Team Championship back to Bullet Club in their first defense. Bennett and Taven returned to NJPW in November to take part in the 2015 World Tag League, where they finished with a record of two wins and four losses, failing to advance from their block.

Impact Wrestling (2022–present)
On January 8, 2022, at Hard To Kill, The OGK made their Impact Wrestling debut along with PCO and Vinny Marseglia attacking Heath, Rhino and others following their match.

On August 26, 2022, Taven and Bennett defeated The Good Brothers (Doc Gallows and Karl Anderson) to win the Impact World Tag Team Championships. This match aired on tape delay on the September 1 episode of Impact!.

All Elite Wrestling (2022–present)
The Kingdom debut for AEW in 2022 under The Kingdom name once again.

Championships and accomplishments 
Consejo Mundial de Lucha Libre
NWA World Historic Welterweight Championship (1 time) – Taven

Impact Wrestling
 Impact World Tag Team Championship (1 time)

New Japan Pro-Wrestling
IWGP Tag Team Championship (1 time) – Bennett and Taven

Ring of Honor
ROH World Championship (2 times) – Cole (1) and Taven (1)
ROH World Tag Team Championship (1 time) – Bennett and Taven
ROH World Six-Man Tag Team Championship (3 times) – Taven, O'Ryan and Marseglia
Honor Rumble (2014) – Bennett
Survival of the Fittest (2014) – Cole
ROH World Six-Man Tag Team Championship Tournament (2016) – Taven, O'Ryan and Marseglia

The Wrestling Revolver
Revolver Tag Team Championship (1 time)

References 

Ring of Honor teams and stables
New Japan Pro-Wrestling teams and stables
Independent promotions teams and stables